Dunaway is a surname. Notable people with the surname include:

 Craig Dunaway (born 1961), former professional American football tight end
 David King Dunaway (21st century), Pete Seeger's official biographer
 Dennis Dunaway (born 1946), bass guitarist
 Faye Dunaway (born 1941), Academy Award, Emmy Award and multi-Golden Globe Award-winning American actress
 George W. Dunaway (1922–2008), United States Army soldier
 Hollie Dunaway (born 1984), world-class female professional boxer
 Jim Dunaway (born 1941), American football player
 Judson Dunaway (1890–1976), inventor, entrepreneur, and philanthropist
 Judy Dunaway (born 1964), composer, improvisor and conceptual artist
 Michele Dunaway (born 1965), best-selling American author
 Wilma Dunaway (21st century), American academic

See also
 Dunaway warning